Lev Vladimirovich Kuleshov (– 29 March 1970) was a Russian and Soviet filmmaker and film theorist, one of the founders of the world's first film school, the Moscow Film School. He was given the title People's Artist of the RSFSR in 1969. He was intimately involved in development of the style of film making known as Soviet montage, especially its psychological underpinning, including the use of editing and the cut to emotionally influence the audience, a principle known as the Kuleshov effect. He also developed the theory of creative geography, which is the use of the action around a cut to connect otherwise disparate settings into a cohesive narrative.

Life and career
Lev Kuleshov was born in 1899 into an intellectual Russian family. His father Vladimir Sergeyevich Kuleshov was of noble heritage; he studied art in the Moscow School of Painting, Sculpture and Architecture, despite his own father's disapproval. He then married a village schoolteacher Pelagia Aleksandrovna Shubina who was raised in an orphanage, which only led to more confrontation. They gave birth to two sons: Boris and Lev.

At the time Lev Kuleshov was born, the family became financially broke, lost their estate and moved to Tambov, living a modest life. In 1911 Vladimir Kuleshov died; three years later Lev and his mother moved to Moscow where his elder brother was studying and working as an engineer. Lev Kuleshov decided to follow the steps of his father and entered the Moscow School of Painting, although he didn't finish it. In 1916 he applied to work at the film company led by Aleksandr Khanzhonkov. He produced scenery for Yevgeni Bauer's pictures, such as The King of Paris, For Happiness and others. With time Kuleshov became more interested in film theory. He co-directed his first movie Twilight in 1917. His next film was released under the Soviet patronage.

During 1918–1920 he covered the Russian Civil War with a documentary crew. In 1919 he headed the first Soviet film courses at the National Film School. Kuleshov may well be the very first film theorist as he was a leader in the Soviet montage theory – developing his theories of editing before those of Sergei Eisenstein (briefly a student of Kuleshov). He contributed the article "Kinematografichesky naturshchik" to the first issue of Zrelishcha in 1922. Among his other notable students were Vsevolod Pudovkin, Boris Barnet, Mikhail Romm, Sergey Komarov, Porfiri Podobed, Vladimir Fogel and Aleksandra Khokhlova who became his wife. For Kuleshov, the essence of the cinema was editing, the juxtaposition of one shot with another. To illustrate this principle, he created what has come to be known as the Kuleshov effect. In this now-famous editing exercise, shots of an actor were intercut with various meaningful images (a casket, a bowl of soup, etc.) in order to show how editing changes viewers' interpretations of images. Another one of his famous inventions was creative geography, also known as artificial landscape. Those techniques were described in his book The Basics of Film Direction (1941) which was later translated into many languages.

In addition to his theoretical and teaching work, Kuleshov directed a number of feature-length films. Among his most notable works are an action-comedy The Extraordinary Adventures of Mr. West in the Land of the Bolsheviks (1924), a psychological drama By the Law (1926) adapted from the short story by Jack London and a biographical drama The Great Consoler (1933) based on O. Henry's life and works. In 1934 and 1935 Kuleshov went to Tajikistan to direct there Dokhunda, a movie based on the novel by Tajik national poet Sadriddin Ayni, but the project was regarded with suspicion by the authorities as possibly exciting Tajik nationalism, and stopped. No footage survives.

After directing his last film in 1943, Kuleshov served as an artistic director and an academic rector at VGIK where he worked for the next 25 years. He was a member of the jury at the 27th Venice International Film Festival, as well as a special guest during other international film festivals.

Lev Kuleshov died in Moscow in 1970. He was buried at the Novodevichy Cemetery. He was survived by his wife Aleksandra Khokhlova (1897–1985) – an actress, film director and educator, granddaughter of Pavel Tretyakov and Sergey Botkin – and Aleksandra's son Sergei from her first marriage.

Awards and honours
 Order of the Red Banner of Labour (1944)
 Order of Lenin (1967)
 People's Artist of the RSFSR (1969)

Filmography

References

Further reading
 Kuleshov, Lev. Kuleshov on Film, translated and edited, with an introduction by Ronald Levaco. Berkeley: University of California Press, 1974.
 Kuleshov, L.V. Kuleshov on Film: Writings. Berkeley, CA: University of California Press, 1974.
 Kuleshov, L. V., and E. S. Khokhlova. Fifty Years in Films: Selected Works. Moscow: Raduga Publishers, 1987.
 Drubek, Natascha. Russisches Licht. Von der Ikone zum frühen sowjetischen Kino, Wien – Köln – Weimar: Böhlau 2012. 
 Izvolov, Nikolai and Natascha Drubek-Meyer. “Annotations for the Hyperkino Edition of Lev Kulershov’s Engineer Prite’s Project (1918), Academia Series, RUSCICO 2010.” Studies in Russian & Soviet Cinema. 4.1 (2010): 65-93.
 Kepley, Jr., Vance. “Mr. Kuleshov in the Land of the Modernists.” The Red Screen: Politics, Society, Art in Soviet Cinema. Ed. Anna Lawton. London; New York: Routledge, 1992. 132-47. 
 Norris, Stephen. Lev Kuleshov (Dir.), “Proekt Inzhenera Praita” (“Engineer Prite’s Project”); “Velikii uteshitel’ (O. Genri v tiur’me)” (“The Great Consoler (O’Henry in Prison”) (DVD Review 2011). https://artmargins.com/lev-kuleshov-dir-qproekt-inzhenera-praitaq-qengineer-prites-projectq-qvelikii-uteshitel-o-genri-v-tiurmeq-qthe-great-consoler-ohenry-in-prisonq-dvd-review/
 Olenina, Ana. “Lev Kuleshov’s Retrospective in Bologna, 2008: An Interview with Ekaterina Khokhlova.” Art Margins Online. (Oct 2008). 
 Yampolsky, Mikhail. “Kuleshov’s Experiments and the New Anthropology of the Actor.” Inside the Film factory: New Approaches to Russian and Soviet Filmmaking. Eds. Richard Taylor and Ian Christie. London, UK: Routledge, 1994, 31-50.

External links

 
 An interview with Lev Kuleshov's grand-daughter, the film scholar Ekaterina Khokhlova. By Ana Olenina.

1899 births
1970 deaths
20th-century Russian male actors
20th-century Russian screenwriters
People from Tambov
People from Tambovsky Uyezd
Academic staff of the Gerasimov Institute of Cinematography
Moscow School of Painting, Sculpture and Architecture alumni
Communist Party of the Soviet Union members
People's Artists of the RSFSR
Recipients of the Order of Lenin
Recipients of the Order of the Red Banner of Labour
Film theorists
Male screenwriters
Silent film directors
Russian film directors
Russian inventors
Russian screenwriters
Russian silent film actors
Soviet film directors
Soviet screenwriters
Burials at Novodevichy Cemetery